Keisuke Hayasaka (早坂 圭介, born June 19, 1984) is a Japanese former professional baseball infielder. He played with the Chiba Lotte Marines in Nippon Professional Baseball in 2003 and from 2006 to 2014.

External links

NPB

1984 births
Living people
Chiba Lotte Marines players
Japanese baseball players
Nippon Professional Baseball center fielders
Nippon Professional Baseball left fielders
Nippon Professional Baseball second basemen
Nippon Professional Baseball shortstops
Baseball people from Kanagawa Prefecture